HEPPS may refer to:
Heptaprenyl diphosphate synthase, an enzyme
HEPPS (molecule), a compound commonly used as a buffering agent